Pembroke, Florida may refer to:

Pembroke Park, Florida, originally named Pembroke, Broward County
Pembroke Pines, Florida, Broward County
Pembroke, Polk County, Florida, a ghost town in Florida